Qiemo Airport was an airport serving Qiemo Town in Xinjiang Uyghur Autonomous Region, China. After passenger service to the airport ended in 2011, a 2012 CAAC report stated that Qiemo Airport had been closed. It was replaced by Qiemo Yudu Airport in December 2016, where Qiemo Town regained commercial air service.

History
Qiemo Airport received its last passenger flights in 2011. In the same year, civil aviation officials in Xinjiang announced that a new airport would be built to serve Qiemo Town. In its 2012 Civil Aviation Development Statistics Bulletin, the CAAC reported that Qiemo Airport had been closed. The new airport, Qiemo Yudu Airport, opened on 19 December 2016, where commercial air service to Qiemo Town resumed. The new airport has a runway longer than that of Qiemo Airport.

Infrastructure 
It had one paved runway with dimensions .

References

Defunct airports in China
Airports in Xinjiang